Nizhny Arshi (Dargwa: УбяхӀ ГӀярши) is a rural locality (a selo) in Arshimakhinsky Selsoviet, Levashinsky District, Republic of Dagestan, Russia. The population was 548 as of 2010. There are 8 streets.

Geography 
Nizhny Arshi is located 26 km southwest of Levashi (the district's administrative centre) by road. Verkhniye Arshi and Khadzhalte are the nearest rural localities.

Nationalities 
Dargins live there.

References 

Rural localities in Levashinsky District